= Teaching games for understanding =

Teaching Games for Understanding is an approach to physical education developed by Peter Werner, David Bunker, and Rod Thorpe, and was adopted in the year 2002 by a group of representatives, associations and individuals from all around the world. It is a global agenda for scholarly inquiry in the field of teaching with the help of games.

== Process ==
The fundamental concept of this model is "understanding". The process of this model is

1. Game Form: Introduction of the game in the process of building upon the entire form of the game.
2. Game Appreciation: Clear understanding of the rules and regulations of the game played.
3. Tactical Awareness: Understanding of the techniques of the game in accordance to the rules and regulations.
4. Decision Making: It is a necessity to make timely decisions in accordance to the changing environment due to the dynamic nature of the game.
5. Skill Execution: In relation to the learners capabilities and understanding execution of the required movements involved in the game takes place in this step of the process.
6. Performance: The learning outcome will be analyzed which will be subjective in nature as each learner's understanding level will be different. Through this, one can understand and measure the appropriateness of response was and the efficient use of technique by the player.
